Blaž Rola was the defending champion but chose not to defend his title.

Renzo Olivo won the title after defeating Thiago Monteiro 6–4, 7–6(7–5) in the final.

Seeds

Draw

Finals

Top half

Bottom half

References
Main Draw
Qualifying Draw

Campeonato Internacional de Tenis de Santos - Singles